The 2014 Soul Train Music Awards was held at the Orleans Arena in Las Vegas, Nevada, on Centric and BET on November 30, 2014. The ceremony, hosted by media personality Wendy Williams, honored artists in 12 different categories. The nominees were announced October 13, 2014. R&B artist Chris Brown lead with seven nominations, including Best R&B/Soul Male Artist, Song of the Year, and Video of the Year. Beyoncé had six nominations, including Best R&B/Soul Female Artist, and Pharrell Williams has five nominations, including Best R&B/Soul Male Artist of the Year.

Special awards

Legend Award
 Kool and the Gang

Winners and nominees
Winners are in bold text.

Album of the Year
 Beyoncé – Beyoncé
 Drake – Nothing Was the Same
 Michael Jackson – Xscape
 John Legend – Love in the Future
 Janelle Monáe – The Electric Lady
 Pharrell Williams – Girl

Song of the Year
 Pharrell Williams – "Happy"
 Beyoncé  – "Drunk in Love"
 Chris Brown  – "Loyal"
 Drake  – "Hold On, We're Going Home"
 Michael Jackson and Justin Timberlake – "Love Never Felt So Good"
 John Legend – "All of Me"

Video of the Year
 Pharrell Williams – "Happy"
 Jhené Aiko – "The Worst"
 Aloe Blacc – "The Man"
 Beyoncé  – "Drunk in Love"
 Chris Brown  – "New Flame"
 Usher – "Good Kisser"

The Ashford & Simpson Songwriter's Award
 John Legend – "All of Me"
 Written by: John Stephens and Toby Gad
 Jhené Aiko – "The Worst"
 Written by: Jhené Aiko Chilombo, Mac Robinson and Brian Warfield
 Aloe Blacc – "The Man"
 Written by: Egbert Dawkins III, Elton John, Bernie Taupin, Sam Barsh, Daniel Seeff and Khalil Abdul Rahman
 Beyoncé – "Pretty Hurts"
 Written by: Joshua Coleman, Sia Furler, Beyoncé Knowles
 Sam Smith – "Stay with Me"
 Written by: James Napier, William Phillips and Sam Smith
 Pharrell Williams – "Happy"
 Written by: Pharrell Williams

Best R&B/Soul Male Artist
 Trey Songz
 Chris Brown
 Kem
 John Legend
 Tank
 Pharrell Williams

Best R&B/Soul Female Artist (The Chaka Khan Award for Best R&B/Soul Female)
 Beyoncé
 Jhené Aiko
 Marsha Ambrosius
 Jennifer Hudson
 Ledisi
 Janelle Monáe

Best New Artist
 Nico & Vinz
 Jhené Aiko
 August Alsina
 Sevyn Streeter
 Liv Warfield
 Mack Wilds

Centric Award
 Leela James
 AverySunshine
 Robert Glasper
 Kelis
 Luke James
 Shaliek

Best Gospel/Inspirational Song
 Erica Campbell  – "Help"
 Inspired People  – "Real Love"
 Tamela Mann – "I Can Only Imagine"
 Donnie McClurkin  – "We Are Victorious"
 Smokie Norful – "No Greater Love"
 Michelle Williams  – "Say Yes"

Best Hip-Hop Song of the Year
 Chris Brown  – "Loyal"
 Iggy Azalea  – "Fancy"
 Drake  – "Hold On, We're Going Home"
 Nicki Minaj – "Pills n Potions"
 Schoolboy Q  – "Studio"
 T.I.  – "No Mediocre"

Best Dance Performance
 Chris Brown  – "Loyal"
 Jason Derulo  – "Talk Dirty"
 DJ Snake and Lil Jon – "Turn Down for What"
 Janelle Monáe  – "Electric Lady"
 Tinashe  – "2 On"
 Usher – "Good Kisser"

Best Collaboration
 Chris Brown  – "Loyal"
 Toni Braxton and Babyface – "Hurt You"
 Chris Brown  – "New Flame"
 Robert Glasper  – "Calls"
 Michael Jackson and Justin Timberlake – "Love Never Felt So Good"
 Janelle Monáe  – "PrimeTime"

CENTRICTV.com Awards

Best Independent R&B/Soul Performance
 Joe  – "Love & Sex Pt. 2"
 Terrace Martin  – "You're the One"
 Sebastian Mikael  – "Last Night""
 Kelly Price – "It's My Time"
 Shaliek – "The Past"
 Liv Warfield – "Why Do You Lie?"

Best International Performance
 Machel Montano – "Ministry of Road (M.O.R.)"
 Davido – "Aye"
 Ziggy Marley – "I Don't Want to Live On Mars"
 Nico & Vinz – "Am I Wrong"
 Shaggy  – "You Girl"
 Sam Smith – "Stay with Me"

Best Traditional Jazz Performance
 Wynton Marsalis – "Flee as a Bird to the Mountain"
 Monty Alexander – "Concierto de Aranjuez"
 Kenny Garrett – "Pushing the World Away"
 Audra McDonald – "What a Little Moonlight Can Do"
 Gregory Porter – "Hey Laura"

Best Contemporary Jazz Performance
 Liv Warfield – "Stay – Soul Lifted"
 Vandell Andrew – "Let's Ride"
 Robert Glasper  – "Calls"
 Terrace Martin  – "It's Yours"
 Najee  – "In the Mood to Take It Slow"
 Snarky Puppy – "Lingus (We Like It Here)"

Performers
 Chris Brown
 Jodeci
 Stephanie Mills
 Kem
 Ledisi
 Nico and Vinz
 Tinashe
 Trey Songz

Tribute performers
 Kool and the Gang Tribute
 Tamar Braxton
 Yo Yo
 Missy Elliott
 Da Brat
 Total
 MC Lyte
 Lil Kim

References

External links
 BET Official website

Soul Train Music Awards
Soul
Soul
Soul
Soul
Soul Train Music Awards 2014